Gordon Shepherd (born 21 December 1935) is the former chairman of Barnsley F.C. He was chairman since 2004 after Peter Ridsdale resigned. He retired at the end of the 2007–08 season.

References

English football chairmen and investors
Living people
1935 births
Barnsley F.C. non-playing staff